Kletnya is an urban-type settlement and the administrative centre of Kletnyansky District, in Bryansk Oblast, Russia. It is located on the Nadva River (Dnieper basin), 99 km west of the city of Bryansk. It is the final railway station on the branch line that connects Kletnya with Zhukovka, 43 km away, where it joins the main line between Bryansk and Smolensk. Population:

History 
The town was founded as Lyudinka in 1880, in connection with the start of logging in the region. In 1918 it was designated as a rural centre in Bryansky Uyezd, and since 1929 it has been the administrative centre of Kletnyansky District. In 1935 it was granted the status of an urban-type settlement.

During the Great Patriotic War the forests in the region were one of the centers of the partisan movement. On 28 June 2012 the town was awarded the honorary title "" by the regional government.

References

Urban-type settlements in Bryansk Oblast
Oryol Governorate
1880 establishments in the Russian Empire
Populated places established in 1880